Donald P. Ryder (August 28, 1926 - February 17, 2021) was an American architect. He designed many buildings as the co-founder of Bond Ryder & Associates with J. Max Bond Jr., and he taught at the City College of New York from 1972 to 2001.

References

1926 births
2021 deaths
City College of New York faculty
People from Springfield, Ohio
University of Illinois alumni
20th-century American architects
21st-century American architects